Gorka Otxoa Odriozola (born 13 January 1979 in Irún, Gipuzkoa, Spain) is a Spanish comedian and actor.

Biography 
Otxoa began in minor roles in several TV-Series. He had an important role in the Basque series Goenkale where he performed a character until his death due to a foodborne illness. Although he is most known by the ETB sketch-program Vaya Semanita.	

In 2009 was on the cast of the Spanish adaptation of the US sketch comedy Saturday Night Live.

In 2017 he starred in the play Bajo Terapia in Madrid.

Filmography

Film
 El Palo (comedia (2001)
 Noviembre (2003)
 Etxera (2004)
 Limoncello (2007)
 Un poco de chocolate (2008)
 Pagafantas (2009)
 ¿Estás Ahí? (2010)
 Lobos de Arga (2011)
 Bypass (2012)
 Los miércoles no existen (2015)
 Reevolution (2016)
 Love at First Kiss (2023)

Television
 El Comisario (2000–2002)
 Hospital Central (2002)
 Cuéntame como pasó (2002–2004)
 Goenkale (2003)
 Martin (2003)
 Vaya Semanita (2003–2004)
 Los Serrano (2005)
 Tirando a dar (2006)
 Mi querido Klikowsky (2006–2010)
 Cafetería Manhattan (2007)
 Cuestión de sexo (2007–2009)
 Saturday Night Live (2009)
 Doctor Mateo (2009–2011)
 Qué vida más triste (2010)
 Plaza de España (2011)
 Vive cantando (2013–2014)
 Águila Roja (2015)
 Aupa Josu (2015)
 Velvet (2015–2016)
 Allí abajo (2017–2018)
 A Private Affair (2022)
 Alpha Males (2022)

Stage 
 Olvida los tambores (2009) by Ana Diosdado
 The Mousetrap (2010) by Agatha Christie
 Bajo Terapia (2017)

References

External links 
 

Male actors from the Basque Country (autonomous community)
Spanish male film actors
Spanish male stage actors
Spanish male television actors
1979 births
Living people
21st-century Spanish male actors
Spanish comedians
Spanish stand-up comedians
People from Irun
Basque-language actors